Calvin Christian Collegiate is a high school in Transcona, Manitoba, Canada. Calvin was established in 2002 and delivers education from a Christian perspective.

Overview
Calvin Christian Collegiate was established in 2002 to extend the educational program at Calvin Christian School into the high school years. The former Park Circle School in Transcona was purchased in the early months of 2002, renovations were undertaken and by September the school was ready for occupancy. The grade 7 to 9 population from the Sutton Avenue campus was moved to the new location and grade 10 was added that year. In subsequent years grade 11 and 12 were added.

History
Calvin Christian School comes from a Reformed religious and philosophical tradition dating back to the 1800s. It originally had strong denominational connections with Reformed churches and remains strongly influenced by reformed theology. In the late 1950s, a group of Dutch immigrants worked together to establish a Christian school. All of these immigrants were from the Christian Reformed Churches in Winnipeg and that gave the school a Dutch Calvinist background. However, due to the Reformed traditions and philosophical perspectives regarding church connections, Calvin Christian School has been interdenominational since its founding. The founders associated themselves with The Greater Winnipeg Society of Christian Education and set about planning what would become Calvin Christian School. They built a seven-room school that opened its doors in September 1960 to 65 students. Today, 60 churches are represented within the student body. The philosophy of today is characterized as small "r" reformed because it is not about a connection to a Reformed Church, it is about a philosophical connection to early reformed thinkers.

By the late 1980s, portable classrooms had multiplied around the original building and it was necessary to build in order accommodate the growth. Property was acquired to the east of the original building, and construction began in 1989. Eight classrooms were added to the east side of the building, and a new library, multipurpose room, administrative area and gymnasium were added to the west side. The original building was between the two new wings, and was renovated in the summer of 1990. Space again became a problem in the late 1990s. In 1997, that gave rise to the construction of the north wing, which included a computer lab, two more classrooms, and a staff room.

For more space, the school took over the former Aurthur Day School in Transcona. This was to both alleviate growing pains and to also house Calvin's first-ever high school program. In September 2002, it opened the doors to Calvin Christian Collegiate, the school's second campus, housing Grades 7 to 9 and the newly created 10 to 12 program.
Recently a new gym has been added.

External links
 Official website

High schools in Winnipeg
Educational institutions established in 2002
2002 establishments in Manitoba
Transcona, Winnipeg